Govinda Govinda is a 1994 Telugu-language supernatural thriller film produced by C. Aswani Dutt under the Vyjayanthi Movies banner and directed by Ram Gopal Varma. It stars Nagarjuna, Sridevi, Master Anil Raj and Paresh Rawal. Music is composed by Raj–Koti. 

Govinda Govinda released on 21 January 1994 was not commercially successful in its theatrical run. But it attained a cult status over the years. The film was dubbed and released in Hindi as The Great Robbery.

Plot
Somewhere in time between Treta Yuga and Kali Yuga, sage Bhrigu after performing Lok Kalyana Yaga, visits Vaikuntha and Lord Vishnu was reposing on Adisesha with Sri Mahalakshmi in service at his feet. Finding that Lord Vishnu did not notice him, the sage was infuriated and kicked the Lord on His chest, the place where Mahalakshmi resides. Vishnu, in an attempt to pacify the sage, got hold of the legs of the sage and started to press them gently in a way that was comforting to the sage. During this act, he squeezed the extra eye that was present in the sole of Bhrigu's foot. The extra eye is believed to represent the sage's egotism. The sage then realized his grave mistake and apologized to Vishnu. Thereupon, the sage concluded that Lord Vishnu was supreme of the Trimurti and told the rishis the same. Sri Mahalakshmi was angered by the action of Her Lord in apologizing to Bhrigu, who committed an offense. Out of anger and anguish, She left Vaikuntha. After the departure of Mahalakshmi, a forlorn Lord Vishnu left Vaikunta, came down to Earth, and took abode in an ant-hill under a tamarind tree, beside a Pushkarini on the Venkata hill, meditating for the return of Lakshmi, without food or sleep. Disturbed with this phenomenon, angels and Devtas, appeal to Lord Vishnu to bring back goddess Lakshmi to help sustain the Universe, hence In Kali Yuga, Lord Vishnu takes the form of Venkateswara and incarnates on the Earth.

In present-day Bangkok, a Tantric Stavroj believes that by donating a virgin woman's head to Lord Venkateswara's crown, he aims to attain supernatural powers through Telekinesis, which would bring down the universe to his feet. The Tantric wizard plans for execution of the theft of the Deity's Crown at the Venkateswara Temple, Tirumala, India for one million dollars in association with Bombay's notorious underworld mafia don Paresh, an experienced burglar known for grave robbery, and smuggling rare metals on the black market. In Bangkok, Naveena, a non-resident Indian woman, after the death of her parents, and 23 years in Bangkok, decides to go to her home town, Tadepalligudem in India to bring back her paternal grandmother to Bangkok. In India, on her vacation to Tirumala, she gets in touch with a Taxi driver Seenu, and establishes a relationship with him. Seenu's father is the guard of Venkateshwara Temple. One fine day, Seenu helped Naveena from a group of thieves who are trying to cheat her. From that time, they both have good understanding and started liking each other.

A small boy, whose parents left him at the streets of Venkateshwara Temple, was adopted by the main priest J.V. Somayajulu. The boy is a good friend to Seenu. Naveena took photos of that temple and met the Main priest and Seenu's father. Upon their request, she visited their home. Seenu starts liking her but thinks of her status and didn't proposed her. He also saved her life from a Bear, which tried to kill her. Naveena returned to Bangkok, giving him her address.

One day, Seenu's father is ill and cannot go to the Temple. Then, Paresh, along with this gang, robbed the crown and went to Bangkok unknowing that the small boy has seen them. Meanwhile, police starts questioning Seenu's father as he didn't informed his illness to any higher official.

Police Investigation found gangster Paresh visiting card and his location in Bangkok. Police taken Seenu along with the boy to Bangkok in search of the robbers. They reached the address on the visiting card and the robbers killed the policeman as Seenu is unaware of it. Boy and the Seenu were caught by the police of Bangkok as they are roaming on the streets. He doesn't know the language over there. Suddenly, Naveena seen the boy in the Television and saved them from cops. As their goal is to find the crown, they started searching of the missing policeman in the club. Stavroj's companion cheated Paresh as they tried to kill by taking the crown. Paresh escaped with the crown and demanded more amount from them.

The boy has seen Paresh from a distance and shown him to Seenu. The couple, Seenu and Naveena, followed him to an old Temple in Bangkok. Stavroj's men captured Naveena and Paresh, and taken them to him. Seenu and the boy went to save them. When Stavroj tried to kill the boy, Naveena came in middle and she got injured and fell down. Then, Seenu tried to kill Stavroj but he didn't, as Stavroj is very powerful Wizard. The boy gives Seenu a chakram, the wheel weapon of Lord Venkateshwara and Seenu killed Stavroj. Then, the boy, in the form of Lord Venkateshwara eliminated all their wounds.

At last, Seenu is married to Naveena and they all visited Lord Venkateshwara Temple and prayed the Lord for their best wishes.

Cast

Nagarjuna as Seenu
Sridevi as Naveena
Master Anilraj as Babu
Paresh Rawal as Paresh
Kota Srinivasa Rao as Satyananda Swamy
Gummadi as Brughu Maharshi
J. V. Somayajulu as Main Priest
Arun Govil as Lord Vishnu
Yamuna as Goddess Mahalakshmi
Sudhakar as Hanumanthu
Dhir as Stavroj
Chang as Chang
Sreedhar Surapaneni as Narayana
S. Gopala Reddy as CBI Officer
Peketi Sivaram as Bangkok Airport Indian
Kallu Chidambaram as Hotel Boy
Kadambari Kiran as Seenu's Friend
Uttej as Bus Stand Coolie
Suryakantam as Bamma
Annapurna as Seenu's Mother
Silk Smitha as item number

Soundtrack 

The film songs composed by Raj–Koti. Music released on SUPREME Music Company.

References

External links

1994 films
1990s heist films
1990s Telugu-language films
1990s supernatural thriller films
Films about telekinesis
Indian heist films
Indian supernatural thriller films
Films directed by Ram Gopal Varma
Films scored by Raj–Koti